Galls (from the Latin , 'oak-apple') or cecidia (from the Greek , anything gushing out) are a kind of swelling growth on the external tissues of plants, fungi, or animals. Plant galls are abnormal outgrowths of plant tissues, similar to benign tumors or warts in animals. They can be caused by various parasites, from viruses, fungi and bacteria, to other plants, insects and mites. Plant galls are often highly organized structures so that the cause of the gall can often be determined without the actual agent being identified. This applies particularly to some insect and mite plant galls. The study of plant galls is known as cecidology.

In human pathology, a gall is a raised sore on the skin, usually caused by chafing or rubbing.

Causes of plant galls

Insects and mites

Insect galls are the highly distinctive plant structures formed by some herbivorous insects as their own microhabitats. They are plant tissue which is controlled by the insect.  Galls act as both the habitat and food source for the maker of the gall. The interior of a gall can contain edible nutritious starch and other tissues. Some galls act as "physiologic sinks", concentrating resources in the gall from the surrounding plant parts. Galls may also provide the insect with physical protection from predators.

Insect galls are usually induced by chemicals injected by the larvae of the insects into the plants, and possibly mechanical damage. After the galls are formed, the larvae develop inside until fully grown, when they leave. In order to form galls, the insects must take advantage of the time when plant cell division occurs quickly: the growing season, usually spring in temperate climates, but which is extended in the tropics.

The meristems, where plant cell division occurs, are the usual sites of galls, though insect galls can be found on other parts of the plant, such as the leaves, stalks, branches, buds, roots, and even flowers and fruits.  Gall-inducing insects are usually species-specific and sometimes tissue-specific on the plants they gall.

Indicator insects 

Gall-inducing insects include gall wasps, gall midges, gall flies (e.g., the goldenrod gall fly), Agromyzidae, aphids (such as Melaphis chinensis,  Pemphigus spyrothecae, and Pemphigus betae), scale insects, psyllids, thrips, gall moths (e.g., Epiblema scudderiana), and weevils.

Galls produced by insects and mites include:

 Ash flower gall: this gall is caused by a small mite that causes irregular distortion of male flowers. The galls are initially green, then dry and turn brown.
A small cavity within each gall contains one or more small maggots, the larval stages of very small flies called midges. Female midges lay their eggs in very young leaflets during early spring. Gall formation begins soon after the eggs are laid. Specifics of the biology of this insect are not known. The galls probably do not harm tree health.
The irregular edge of the gall and its red color at maturity account for the common name. The galls dry, harden and turn brown as they age. Aphids may be seen through a slit-like opening in the underside of the gall. This insect has a complex life cycle—it forms galls on elm in early summer, then feeds on grass roots later in the summer. The galls apparently do not cause significant harm to the tree.
 Hackberry leaf gall: this gall is caused by a small ( long) aphid-like insect with sucking mouthparts called a jumping plant louse. The adults spend the winter under bark crevices and can invade houses in large numbers in the fall. Females lay eggs over a long period of time beginning when leaves begin to unfold from the buds in the spring. Feeding by the nymphs that hatch from these eggs causes abnormal plant growth that forms a pouch. The psyllids remain inside the galls until they emerge as adults in late summer to early fall. There is one generation each year. Heavy infestations can result in premature leaf drop which over a series of years may affect tree health. 
 Honeylocust pod gall: this gall is caused by a small fly (midge). The sunburst cultivar appears to be very susceptible to this pest. Infested leaves have globular or pod-like distortions that contain one to several small maggots ( long). Infestations begin when females lay eggs in young leaflets. There are five or more generations each year. Infested leaves often drop prematurely and repeated damage can kill small branches. New shoots develop at the base of dead twigs. As a result, the natural shape of the tree may be lost.
 Oak gall: see Oak apple
 Petiole and stipule galls: thick globe-like galls can develop on leaf petioles and stems. Many of these are caused by insects called phylloxerans which are very similar to aphids. The hard, woody galls may remain on the tree for several years. Usually, there is one generation each year and the insects over winter on the tree in the egg stage.
 Willow shoot galls: these swellings on shoots, twigs, or leaf petioles, may be caused by small flies (midges) or small wasps (sawflies). The gall increases in size as long as the immature stages are active. They cause no significant injury. The infestation may be reduced by pruning and destroying the galled areas before the adult insect emerges, usually in late summer.
 Witchhazel gall: this gall is caused by an aphid that passes the winter in eggs laid on twigs of the plant. Feeding by the aphid causes the formation of conical galls on the upper side of the leaf. Each gall, produced by a single aphid, later becomes filled with offspring. Mature aphids with wings leave the galls in late spring and early summer and fly to birch. After several generations there, the insects return to witch hazel to lay the eggs that survive the winter. No galls are formed on the birch.
 Banksia infructescence galls: microscopic Eriophyid mites (Eriophyidae) commonly cause swellings on young infructescences of Banksia integrifolia and Banksia marginata in south-eastern Australia

 See  List of insect galls

Fungi

Many rust fungi induce gall formation, including western gall rust, which infects a variety of pine trees and cedar-apple rust. Galls are often seen in Millettia pinnata leaves and fruits. Leaf galls appear like tiny clubs; however, flower galls are globose. Exobasidium often induces spectacular galls on its hosts.

The fungus Ustilago esculenta associated with Zizania latifolia, a wild rice, produces an edible gall highly valued as a food source in the Zhejiang and Jiangsu provinces of China.

Bacteria and viruses
Agrobacterium tumefaciens and Pseudomonas savastanoi are examples of gall-causing bacteria. 
Gall forming virus was found on rice plants in central Thailand in 1979 and named rice gall dwarf. Symptoms consisted of gall formation along leaf blades and sheaths, dark green discoloration, twisted leaf tips and reduced numbers of tillers. Some plants died in the glasshouse in later stages of infection. The causal agent was transmitted by Nephotettix nigropictus after an incubation of two weeks. Polyhedral particles of 65 nm diameter in the cytoplasm of phloem cells were always associated with the disease. No serologic relationship was found between this virus and that of rice dwarf.

Nematodes
Nematodes are microscopic worms that live in the soil. Some nematodes (Meloidogyne species or root-knot nematodes) cause galls on the roots of susceptible plants. The galls are small, individual and beadlike in some hosts. Some ectoparasitic nematodes (nematodes that live outside the plant in the soil), such as sting and stubby-root nematodes, may cause root tips to swell. Nitrogen-fixing bacteria (Rhizobium species) cause swellings on the roots of most legumes (such as clover, peas and beans). These swellings, called nodules, are easily distinguished from root-knot galls by differences in how they are attached to the root and their contents. Nodules are loosely attached to the root, while root-knot galls originate from infection at the center of the root, so they are an integral part of the root.

Other plants
Mistletoe can form galls on its hosts.

Uses
Galls are rich in resins and tannic acid and have been used widely in the manufacturing of permanent inks (such as iron gall ink) and astringent ointments, in dyeing, and in leather tanning.

The Talmud records using gallnuts as part of the tanning process as well as a dye-base for ink.

Medieval Arabic literature records many uses for the gall, called  in Arabic. The Aleppo gall, found on oak trees in northern Syria, was among the most important exports from Syria during this period, with one merchant recording a shipment of galls from Suwaydiyya near Antioch fetching the high price of 4½ dinars per 100 pounds. The primary use of the galls was as a mordant for black dyes; they were also used to make a high-quality ink. The gall was also used as a medication to treat fever and intestinal ailments.

The larvae in galls are useful for a survival food and fishing bait, as in the Indigenous Australian foods bush coconut and mulga apple. Nutgalls also produce purpurogallin.

The gall of Rhus chinensis, Galla chinensi, has long been considered to possess many medicinal properties.

Gallery

See also
 Forest pathology
 Burl
 Bush coconut
 Chirosia betuleti
 Mulga apple
 Oak apple
 Oak marble gall
 Knopper gall
 Hackberry nipple gall
 Oak artichoke gall
 Rose bedeguar gall
 Pineapple gall
 Cola-nut gall
 Neuroterus quercusbaccarum – common spangle and currant galls
 Witch's broom

References
Notes

Further reading

External links

 British Plant Gall Society
 A Field Guide to Plant Galls of the North East U.S.
 To Be or Not To Be a Gall: The Story of Strange Growths on Plants 
 Insect Galls. Brandeis University
 Galls in Goldenrod, (Solidago)
 
 Video footage of Scottish Galls